Ophélie Aspord (Bruges, 21 May 1991) is a French distance swimmer. At the 2012 Summer Olympics, she competed in the women's marathon 10 kilometre, finishing in sixth place.

References

1991 births
Living people
Olympic swimmers of France
Swimmers at the 2012 Summer Olympics
French female long-distance swimmers

Sportspeople from Bruges
20th-century French women
21st-century French women